The province of Isernia is a province in the region of Molise in Italy. The provincial capital is the city Isernia and the president of the province is Alfredo Ricci. It contains 52 comunes in the province, listed at comunes of the Province of Isernia.

History
Isernia was known as Samnite Aesernia until it fell under  Roman rule in 263 BC. The territory was later given to Alczeco for his efforts against the Byzantines with his Bulgarian military, by the Duchy of Benevento; most of this territory became Molise County. Throughout the 9th century the area was repeatedly sacked during Muslim invasions and suffered an earthquake in 847; these destroyed the cities of Isernia and Venafro. Despite this, the city was made an episcopal see and was granted the status of county in 964. A 1979 archaeological discovery near the city of Isernia found evidence of a settlement dating back to the Palaeolithic period over 736,000 years ago.

In Molise County, Benedictines formed the San Vincenzo al Volturno monastery in the province of Isernia after Rome fell in 476. When the area was invaded by the Muslims, 500 to 900 monks were decapitated by them and many were taken as slaves; despite this, the monastery continued to function and reached its peak size during the eleventh and twelfth centuries. Pope Celestine V was born near Isernia and the province's feast day is on 19 May, the date Celestine V was canonized. An earthquake in 1805 destroyed Isernia's cathedral, which was rebuilt atop the ruins of the destroyed structure in 1837.

The province gained attention during the COVID-19 pandemic in Italy, as by 15 March it was the only one of Italy's 110 provinces to not have a single confirmed case of the COVID-19 virus.

Geography

The province of Isernia is a largely mountainous area of south-central Italy, part of the region of Molise. To the southwest the mountains decrease in height and the wooded hills give way to the plains around Venafro. To the northeast is the Province of Campobasso, also part of Molise, and to the north the Provinces of L'Aquila and Chieti, both in the region of Abruzzo. To the west is the Province of Frosinone in Lazio and to the south the Province of Caserta in Campania.

There are four mountain ranges in the province and the Abruzzo National Park straddles the border with Abruzzo. The highest peak in the province is Monte Mare, . The main rivers are the Volturno which flows into the Tyrrhenian and the Trigno which flows into the Adriatic. The lake of Castel San Vincenzo is a man-made reservoir built to power a hydroelectric scheme.

The economy of the region has been traditionally based on agriculture. The holdings are mostly small and produce grapes, cereals, olives, vegetables, fruit and dairy products. Traditional products grown in the province include grass peas (Lathyrus sativus) and farro, which is made from a specialist form of wheat. Tintilia grapes are grown for the production of the region's red wine, the "Tintilia del Molise".

References

External links
Official website

 
Isernia